Only You is a 2009 Philippine television drama series based on the 2005 South Korean drama series of the same title. The series was aired on ABS-CBN's Primetime Bida evening block from April 27 to August 21, 2009, replacing I Love Betty La Fea, and was replaced by Dahil May Isang Ikaw.

Synopsis
Despite her mother's protests, Jillian pursues her dream of becoming a chef by joining a cooking contest where she gets a chance to study culinary arts in different Asian countries. Before anyone can stop her, she is already on her way to South Korea with her long-time best friend, Jonathan. But it soon becomes clear to her that skill alone is not enough to make her pass such a difficult course. So in her desperate attempt to succeed and create a good life for her family, she goes in search for a woman who can teach her a winning recipe.

She crosses paths with TJ, an arrogant, wealthy businessman who is looking for his mother, the same woman Jillian is looking for. They hardly get along yet they eventually end up having a one-night stand as Jillian momentarily makes him forget about his worries about his mother's second marriage. They go their separate ways the next morning after a misunderstanding. Later on, Jillian learns that she is pregnant, which means that she cannot continue her studies. A twist of fate brings them together again in the Philippines, six years after their fateful encounter abroad.

Cast and characters

Main cast
 Angel Locsin as Jillian Mendoza
 Diether Ocampo as Jonathan Sembrano
 Sam Milby as Theodore "TJ" Javier, Jr.

Supporting cast
 Tirso Cruz III as Theodore "Teddy" Javier, Sr.
 Iya Villania as Trixie Gonzales
 Dimples Romana as Dina Javier
 Bing Pimentel as Erika Javier
 Al Tantay as Fernando "Nanding" Mendoza / Ramon
 Dick Israel as Rodolfo "Rod" Sembrano / Elvis
 Irma Adlawan as Corazon "Cora" Mendoza
 Candy Pangilinan as Chef Minnie
 Ella Cruz as Andrea Mendoza
 Elijah Magundayao as Joshua Javier

Guest cast
 Angel Sy as young Jillian
 Francis Magundayao as young Jonathan
 Jacob Rica as young TJ
 Hennesy Lee as young Trixie
 Ian Galliguez as China
 Carla Humphries as Agnes Aguirre
 Justin Cuyugan as Vince Lapuz III
 Franzen Fajardo as Aji
 Gabe Mercado as Boyet Marcos
 Jose Sarasola as George
 JC Cuadrado as Derek

Production
Only You had its first cast look test pictorial on February 17, 2009, with Angel Locsin, Diether Ocampo and Sam Milby. Principal photography began on late March 2009 in Seoul, South Korea with Locsin, Ocampo and Milby alongside Iya Villania and Dimples Romana. Filming for the series concluded in the Philippines on August 14, 2009.

Reception
Only You debuted with a 39.2% nationwide rating based on Kantar Media/TNS National Households TV Audience Measurement. The finale episode registered a nationwide average of 39.8% in the TV Ratings based on Kantar Media/TNS National Households data.

See also
List of programs broadcast by ABS-CBN
List of ABS-CBN drama series

References

ABS-CBN drama series
Philippine romance television series
Philippine drama television series
2009 Philippine television series debuts
2009 Philippine television series endings
Television series by Star Creatives
Philippine television series based on South Korean television series
Television shows set in Metro Manila
Television shows set in South Korea
Filipino-language television shows